This is a list of international presidential trips made by Donald Trump, the 45th president of the United States. Donald Trump made 19 international trips to 24 countries (in addition to visiting the West Bank) during his presidency, which began on January 20, 2017 and ended on January 20, 2021. 

Due to the COVID-19 pandemic, he did not make any international trips after February 2020. Therefore Trump's international travel was the least amount of any president since the introduction of the Boeing VC-25. He did not visit Oceania, the Caribbean, or Africa and spent only 3 days in Latin America.

Summary 
The number of visits per country where President Trump traveled are:
 One: Afghanistan, Argentina, Canada, China, Finland, India, Iraq, Israel, North Korea, Philippines, Poland, Saudi Arabia, Singapore, Vatican City and the disputed West Bank
 Two: Belgium, Germany, Ireland, Italy, South Korea, Switzerland and Vietnam
 Three: Japan and the United Kingdom
 Four: France

2017

2018

2019

2020

Multilateral meetings 
Multilateral meetings of the following Intergovernmental organizations took place during President Trump's term in office (2017–2021).

See also 
 Foreign policy of the Donald Trump administration
 Foreign policy of the United States
 List of international trips made by Rex Tillerson as United States Secretary of State
 List of international trips made by Mike Pompeo as United States Secretary of State

References

External links
 Travels of President Donald J. Trump. U.S. Department of State Office of the Historian.

Trips, international
Lists of 21st-century trips
21st century in international relations
Trump, Donald, international
Trump, Donald
Donald Trump-related lists